Turbott is a surname. Notable people with the surname include:

Evan Graham Turbott (born 1914), New Zealand zoologist
Ian Turbott (1922–), New Zealand-born British colonial governor and Australian university chancellor
Harold Bertram Turbott (1899–1988), New Zealand doctor, broadcaster and writer
Harry Turbott (1930 – 2016), a New Zealand architect and landscape architect